The Women's Western Open was an American professional golf tournament founded in 1930. The LPGA was established in 1950, and it recognized the Western Open as one of its major championships through 1967. All of the events back to 1930 have been designated as majors by the LPGA.

Organized by the Women's Western Golf Association, the tournament was match play through 1954, then became a 72-hole stroke play event. All of the winners were American.

Winners

Stroke play era

Match play era

(a) - denotes amateur
PO - won in playoff

Multiple winners
This table lists the golfers who have won more than one Women’s Western Open as a major championship.

Winners by nationality
All of the champions were from the United States.

See also
 Western Open - a men's event on the PGA Tour

References

External links
Women's Western Golf Association
List of winners

 
Former LPGA Tour events
Women's major golf championships